Steuart Campbell (born  in ) is a British writer who lives in Edinburgh.

Career 
Campbell trained as an architect and worked as one until the mid-1970s. He then gained a degree in mathematics and science from the Open University (BA, 1983).
Campbell is the Secretary/Treasurer of the Edinburgh Secular Society.

Writings 
The Loch Ness Monster: The Evidence. 1986 The Aquarian Press (Thorsons Publishing Group) Wellingborough: ; Revised ed. 1991 Aberdeen University Press (Macmillan Pergamon Publishing Corporation) Aberdeen: ; 1996 Birlinn Ltd, Edinburgh: ; 1997 (without subtitle); Prometheus Books,; 2002 Birlinn Ltd,). Argues against the existence of the Loch Ness Monster by analysis of the purported evidence.
The UFO Mystery Solved 1994 Explicit Books, Edinburgh: . A critical examination of UFO reports and their explanation in terms of meteorological and astronomical phenomena;
The Rise and Fall of Jesus with a foreword by Prof. James Thrower 1996 Explicit Books, Edinburgh: ; 2009 Revised and updated ed. WPS (WritersPrintShop): ; 2019 Revised 3rd ed. Tectum Verlag (Nomos Publishing Company), Marburg:  (print),  (ePDF). Exploration of the origins of Christianity, asserting that Jesus wanted to be crucified.
Chinook Crash (The crash of RAF Chinook helicopter ZD576 on the Mull of Kintyre) 2004 Pen & Sword Aviation (Pen & Sword Books Ltd, Barnsley)  (print)  (ebook). An examination of and an explanation for the fatal crash on 2 June 1994.

References

External links
 

1937 births
Alumni of the Open University
British sceptics
Critics of cryptozoology
Living people
People from Birmingham, West Midlands
UFO skeptics